Fahad bin Abdul-Rahman Al-Jalajel (Arabic: فهد بن عبدالرحمن الجلاجل) is the Minister of Health of Saudi Arabia since 15 October 2021.

Early life and education
Al-Jalajel was born in Texas, United States on 17 August 1978. He studied at King Saud University, Saudi Arabia during the 1990s in Riyadh. He holds an Executive Certificate in leadership and management from MIT Sloan School of Management in the United States, and a Master's degree in computer science from Saint Joseph's University, in Pennsylvania in the United States and BSc in Computer Science from King Saud University.

Professional life
In 2012, Fahd Al-Jalajel was appointed as the Undersecretary for Consumer Affairs in the Ministry of Commerce and Industry (Saudi Arabia) (currently the Ministry of Commerce (Saudi Arabia). He was an Advisor to the Minister of Commerce and Industry and General Supervisor of Information Technology in the ministry. He was also the acting Director-General of Information Technology in the General Investment Authority (Saudi Arabia)|The General Investment Authority]] (currently the Ministry of Investment (Saudi Arabia) as well as Director of Networks and Operations. He was also the Director of the Open Source Operating Systems Project (the Computer Society and King Abdulaziz City] Al-Aziz for Science and Technology).

Al-Jalajel was a member of a number of councils and committees, including a member of the Executive Council of Medical Cities, a member of the Health Insurance Council, a member of the board of directors of General Organization of Saudi Airlines, a member of the Competition Protection Council, and a board member of the General Organization for Grains, Silos and Flour Mills.

References

Fahad
1978 births
Health ministers of Saudi Arabia
King Saud University alumni
Living people
People from Riyadh
MIT Sloan School of Management alumni
Saint Joseph University alumni